is a Japanese light novel series written by Chiyomaru Shikura, and is a part of the Science Adventure franchise. It was later adapted into a visual novel and published by Mages in November 2017. The light novel series is licensed in English by J-Novel Club. A manga, illustrated by Ganjii, was serialized in Kodansha's good! Afternoon from October 2015 to May 2017. An anime television series adaptation by A-1 Pictures aired between October and December 2016.

Plot

The story follows nine idiosyncratic individuals, linked by the "Choujou Kagaku Kirikiri Basara" occult summary blog run by 17-year-old second-year high school student Yuuta Gamon. Little incongruities that occur around these nine eventually lead to a larger, unimaginable event that may alter what is considered common sense in this world.

Characters

A high school boy and self-described NEET living in Kichijoji who runs the blog "Kiri Kiri Basara," which aggregates news and discussion of the occult, with hopes of driving enough traffic to his site that he can live off the money from affiliate clickthroughs. He ends up attracting a strange crew of characters around him.

An energetic spirit guide with enormous breasts who is Yuta's best friend. Calls herself "Ryo-tas", and Yuta "Gamotan". She wields an electric stun-gun shaped like an old-fashioned raygun which is dubbed the "Poya-gun" according to Yuta.

An ultra-realist first-year university student, in contrast to his father who is a widely-known professor who specializes in paranormal phenomena.

A popular fortune teller and first-year high school student with her own fanclub at school. She has recently decided to get close to Yuta, joining him and Ryoka to contribute to his blog. They all live in Kichijōji and go to the same school.

A reporter for the occult magazine Mumū.

A black magic proxy who is said to place curses on others, provided she has a sample of the victim's hair and information. She runs her shop in Hamonika-Yokochō (harmonica alley) near Kichijōji Station. Her real name is Ria Minase. Her brother Takaharu died while donating a kidney for her. She was unable to accept the loss and stole her brother's corpse and lived with it for a year, believing that he was still alive with her.

A mysterious individual. Aria thinks he is her ‘devil.’ Claims to have died many times, and appears to be a ghost currently.

A dōjin manga creator with the ability to predict the future. She goes to the same university as Sarai's.

A cosplayer and otaku detective. He is small and looks like a child, but he is 26 years old.

She is an FBI agent who investigates the deaths of case 256. She specializes in psychometry (Touching the dead or the belongings of the dead and seeing their memories). She seems to have an appreciation for Moritsuka, in the anime they do not tell why, but it seems that something has happened between them so that she has so much appreciation for him.

Media

Light novel
The light novels are written by Chiyomaru Shikura and illustrated by Pako. Overlap Bunko published the first volume in August 2014. The series was one of four titles originally offered by J-Novel Club, an online English light novel publisher, when the service first launched.

Three volumes have been released, and there was a planned fourth volume.

Volumes

Video game
A video game adaptation of the novels was announced in March 2015. The game was developed by Mages and originally released for PlayStation 4, PlayStation Vita and Xbox One on 9 November 2017; it had originally been planned for 28 September as a digital-only release, but was delayed due to the addition of a physical release following complaints by fans. The physical PlayStation 4 and PlayStation Vita versions were additionally made available in a limited edition that includes a drama CD and a 64-page materials collection. Shikura has said that he is considering releasing the game in the West.

A Nintendo Switch port was announced in September 2018. It was set to include additional story content set after the main story, which would have further connected the entry to the rest of Mages's Science Adventure series. The story content was also planned to be added to the previously released versions as a free update. However, following an extended period of no additional information, it was confirmed to be cancelled during a livestream in August 2022. Shikura also stated that, if they were to revisit Occultic;Nine one day, it would be with a remake similar to Robotics;Notes Elite.

Manga
A manga adaptation, illustrated by Ganjii, was serialized in Kodansha's seinen manga magazine good! Afternoon from 7 October 2015 to 6 May 2017. Kodansha collected its chapters in four tankōbon volumes, released from 7 April 2016 to 7 July 2017.

Anime
An anime television series adaptation was announced in March 2016, with the cast from the game reprising their roles for the series. The anime was produced by A-1 Pictures and directed by Kyōhei Ishiguro with assistant director Miyuki Kuroki, with To-Jumpei Morita handling series composition, Tomoaki Takase designing the characters, and Masaru Yokoyama composing the music. The opening theme song, titled "Seisū 3 no Nijō", was performed by Kanako Itō, while the ending theme song, titled "Open your eyes", was performed by Asaka. Both theme songs were written by Shikura and were released on 26 October 2016. It premiered on 9 October 2016 on Tokyo MX, ABC, CBC, GTV, GYT and BS11. The series was released across six Blu-ray and DVD home video release volumes containing 2 episodes each, totalling 12 episodes. Aniplex of America has licensed the anime series for North America and released it dubbed in two Blu-ray sets with six episodes each on 26 September and 26 December 2017. The dub was also made available through Crunchyroll on 5 February 2018.

Notes

References

External links
  
 

2014 Japanese novels
2017 video games
Anime and manga based on light novels
Cancelled Nintendo Switch games
J-Novel Club books
Kodansha manga
Light novels
Overlap Bunko
PlayStation 4 games
PlayStation Vita games
Science Adventure
Seinen manga
Seven Seas Entertainment titles
Supernatural anime and manga
Suspense anime and manga
Video games based on novels
Video games developed in Japan
Video games scored by Takeshi Abo
Visual novels
Xbox One games